Jan Józwik (16 March 1952 – 8 December 2021) was a Polish speed skater. He competed in two events at the 1980 Winter Olympics. Józwik died in Zakopane on 8 December 2021, at the age of 69 from COVID-19.

References

External links
 

1952 births
2021 deaths
Polish male speed skaters
Olympic speed skaters of Poland
Speed skaters at the 1980 Winter Olympics
People from Tomaszów Mazowiecki County
Deaths from the COVID-19 pandemic in Poland